This is a list of notable Jewish American biologists and physicians.  For other Jewish Americans, see Lists of Jewish Americans.
 

 David Baltimore, reverse transcriptase, Nobel Prize (1975)
 Baruj Benacerraf, immunologist, Nobel Prize (1980)
 Baruch Blumberg, hepatitis B virus, Nobel Prize (1976)
 Gerty Cori, biochemist, Nobel Prize (1947)
 Gertrude Elion, drug development, Nobel Prize (1988)
 Alfred G. Gilman, biochemist, Nobel Prize (1994)
 H. Robert Horvitz, biologist, Nobel Prize (2002)
 Eric Kandel, biologist, Nobel Prize (2000)
 Arthur Kornberg, DNA replication, Nobel Prize (1959)
 Alisha Kramer, physician and health activist
 Esther Lederberg, geneticist
 Fritz Lipmann, coenzyme A, Nobel Prize (1953)
 Hermann Muller, geneticist, Nobel Prize (1946) (Jewish mother)
 Daniel Nathans, microbiologist, Nobel Prize (1978)
 Jonas Salk, polio vaccine
 Howard Temin, reverse transcriptase, Nobel Prize (1975)
 George Wald, retina pigmentation, Nobel Prize (1967).
 Bret Weinstein, evolutionary biologist
David Julius, nociception, Nobel Prize (2021)
Stanley Falkow, "father of molecular microbial pathogenesis", National Medal of Science (2016)

References

Biologists and physicians
Biologists and physicians
Jewish American
Jewish American